Trije Kralji Ski Resort is a Slovenian family ski resort located in western part of Pohorje mountain in municipality of Slovenska Bistrica. It's 18 km away from closest city Slovenska Bistrica. 

Resort has two slopes, two lifts and together 1,5 km of skiing terrain and 4 km of cross-country skiing. There are plans to build a new chair-lift and two new slopes.

Ski slopes

External links
 jakec.si - official site

Ski areas and resorts in Slovenia